Caitlyn Shadbolt is an Australian singer and songwriter. Shadbolt rose to fame after placing fifth on the sixth season of The X Factor Australia. She released her debut extended play in 2015, which peaked at number 50.

Early life

Career
Shadbolt started playing in a band at the age of 12.

2014: The X Factor Australia
In 2014, Shadbolt successfully auditioned for the sixth season of The X Factor Australia singing "Life Is a Highway" by Tom Cochrane. She made it through to the live shows and was mentored by Ronan Keating, ultimately coming fifth.

 denotes week in the bottom two/three. denotes being eliminated.

2015–2016: Debut EP
In January 2015, Shadbolt released her debut single, "Maps Out The Window" which shot straight to the top of the iTunes Country Singles Chart and reached the Top 5 on the Australian Country Airplay Chart. In July, Shadbolt signed with ABC Music and released her second single, "Shoot Out The Lights". Her self-titled debut EP was released in August 2015 and peaked at number 50.

In 2016, Shadbolt was nominated for "Best New Artist" Country Music Awards, losing to Chrissie Lamb. In March 2016, Shadbolt won New Oz Artist of the Year at the Country Music Channel Awards.

2017–2019: Songs on My Sleeve
In March 2017, Shadbolt released "My Break Up Anthem" as the lead single from her debut studio album Songs on My Sleeve released in May 2017.

2020: Stages
In January 2020, Shadbolt released a new single titled "Bones". Upon release, Shadbolt said "'Bones' is about chasing the dream. It's a song about persistence, passion and trusting your gut instinct. There are always so many hurdles that come with dreaming big, but when you love something enough, you'll do it regardless. It couldn't speak more truth for me." Singles "Porcelain" and "Edge of the Earth" followed with Shadbolt's second studio album, Stages set for release in November 2020.

2021-present: third studio album
On 26 August 2022, Shadbolt released "Lost On Me", the lead single from her forthcoming third studio album.

Discography

Studio albums

Extended plays

Singles

Awards and nominations

AIR Awards
The Australian Independent Record Awards (commonly known informally as AIR Awards) is an annual awards night to recognise, promote and celebrate the success of Australia's Independent Music sector.

|-
| AIR Awards of 2018
|Songs On My Sleeve 
| Best Independent Country Album
| 
|-

Country Music Awards of Australia
The Country Music Awards of Australia is an annual awards night held in January during the Tamworth Country Music Festival. Celebrating recording excellence in the Australian country music industry. They commenced in 1973.

! 
|-
|rowspan="1"| 2016 || Caitlin Shadbolt || New Talent of the Year ||  || 
|-
|rowspan="1"| 2017 || (unknown) || (unknown) ||  ||
|-
|2023 || "Dumb Decisions" (with Melanie Dyer) || Vocal Collaboration of the Year ||  || 
|-

Country Music Channel (CMC)

|-
| 2016 || Herself || New Oz Artist of the Year  || 
|-
| 2017 || Herself || Female Oz Artist of the Year  || 
|-

See also
 The X Factor (Australia season 6)
 List of The X Factor finalists (Australia season 6)

References

External links

Living people
Musicians from Queensland
Australian women singer-songwriters
The X Factor (Australian TV series) contestants
1996 births
21st-century Australian singers
21st-century Australian women singers